James Armstrong (10 October 1892 – 1966) was a professional footballer who played as a centre forward.

References

Portsmouth F.C. players
Sheffield Wednesday F.C. players
1892 births
1966 deaths
English Football League players
English footballers
Association football forwards
Place of death missing
Date of death missing
Scotswood F.C. players